Sycewice  (German Zitzewitz) is a village in the administrative district of Gmina Kobylnica, within Słupsk County, Pomeranian Voivodeship, in northern Poland.

The village has a population of 1,089.

References

Sycewice